Gozenyama Dam  is a rockfill dam located in Ibaraki Prefecture in Japan. The dam is used for irrigation. The catchment area of the dam is 23.3 km2. The dam impounds about 50  ha of land when full and can store 7200 thousand cubic meters of water. The construction of the dam was started on 1987 and completed in 2011.

See also
List of dams in Japan

References

Dams in Ibaraki Prefecture